Lesbian, gay, bisexual, and transgender (LGBT) persons in Antigua and Barbuda may face legal challenges not experienced by non-LGBT citizens.

On 5 July 2022, the Eastern Caribbean Supreme Court ruled that sections of the Penal Code that made consensual same-sex intimacy illegal were unconstitutional, and therefore void. In its ruling, the court set precedent that the constitution protections against sex discrimination by the government cover sexual orientation and gender identity as well, and that as such, the government cannot enforce or introduce laws that discriminate on the basis of sexual orientation or gender identity.

However, the law does not address discrimination or harassment on account of sexual orientation or gender identity, nor does it recognize same-sex unions in any form, whether it be marriage or partnerships. Household headed by same-sex couples are not eligible for the same rights given to opposite-sex married couples.

Legality of same-sex sexual activity

On 5 July 2022, the Eastern Caribbean Supreme Court ruled that sections of the Penal Code that made consensual same-sex intimacy illegal were unconstitutional, and therefore void.

Previously, two sections of the Sexual Offences Act 1995 criminalized same-sex sexual acts:

Section 12. (1) A person who commits buggery is guilty of an offence and is liable on conviction to imprisonment -
   (a) for life, if committed by an adult on a minor;
   (b) for fifteen years, if committed by an adult on another adult;
   (c) for five years, if committed by a minor.
(2) In this section "buggery" means sexual intercourse per anum by a male person with a male person....

Section 15. (1) A person who commits an act of serious indecency on or towards another is guilty of an offence and is liable on conviction to imprisonment -
   (a) for ten years, if committed on or towards a minor under sixteen years of age;
   (b) for five years, if committed on or towards a person sixteen years of age of more....
 *    *    *    *
(3) An act of "serious indecency" is an act, other than sexual intercourse (whether natural or unnatural), by a person involving the use of the genital organ for the purpose of arousing or gratifying sexual desire.

"Repeat Offenders" of buggery also were placed on the Sex Offenders Register for the remainder of their life.

In May 2016, during the United Nations Human Rights Council's Universal Periodic Review, representatives from Argentina, Australia, France, Germany, the Netherlands and Nicaragua advised the Government to repeal the sodomy ban and guarantee full human rights to vulnerable groups such as the LGBT community. Minister of Social Transformation, Samantha Marshall, subsequently announced that the sodomy ban is antiquated and should be repealed. Parliamentary Secretary in the Ministry of Legal Affairs Maureen Payne-Hyman assured the Council that the LGBT community is not persecuted in the country.

On 24 August 2016, the Government of Antigua and Barbuda announced that it has no intentions of repealing the country's sodomy ban. The announcement came after the Belize Supreme Court struck down Belize's sodomy ban as unconstitutional. However, it acknowledged that, because Belize and Antigua and Barbuda have an identical jurisprudence, if an interest group filed a lawsuit against the law in court, then it would most certainly be declared unconstitutional. On 1 November 2019, the Eastern Caribbean Alliance for Diversity and Equality announced it planned to launch a legal challenge against the ban by the end of 2019.

Discrimination protections 
In its 5 July 2022 ruling striking down the nation's sodomy laws, the Eastern Caribbean Supreme Court found that Antigua and Barbuda's constitutional provision against discrimination based on sex also included a prohibition on discrimination based on sexual orientation and gender identity:In giving a liberal and purposive interpretation to section 14(3) of the Constitution the reference to “sex” ought not to merely reference a physical gender. Such an approach would be too linear and restrictive. The reference to “sex” would necessarily encompass concepts such as gender identity, sexual character, and sexual orientation. It would be self-defeating to the constitutional provision if the notion of sex were to be separated from matters of sexual orientation and sexual identification since the concept of sex as a physical gender carries with it a perception of how people identify and are oriented even in those instances when the identification and orientation are stereotypical or traditional in nature.

Public opinion

Gay people in public office

Same-sex marriage

Summary table

See also

Politics of Antigua and Barbuda
LGBT rights in the Commonwealth of Nations
LGBT rights in the Americas
LGBT rights by country or territory

References

Antigua and Barbuda
Politics of Antigua and Barbuda
Human rights in Antigua and Barbuda
Antigua and Barbuda